The 1955 Lafayette Leopards football team was an American football team that represented Lafayette College during the 1955 college football season. Lafayette won the Middle Three Conference championship.

In their fourth year under head coach Steve Hokuf, the Leopards compiled a 6–2 record, and defeated both of their Middle Three opponents. Bob Fyvie and Jack Burcin were the team captains.

Lafayette played its home games at Fisher Field on College Hill in Easton, Pennsylvania.

Schedule

References

Lafayette
Lafayette Leopards football seasons
Lafayette Football